The Tracunhaém River is a river of Pernambuco state in eastern Brazil.

Its estuary on the Atlantic Ocean lies in the  Acaú-Goiana Extractive Reserve, a sustainable use conservation unit created in 2007.

See also
List of rivers of Pernambuco

References

Brazilian Ministry of Transport

Rivers of Pernambuco